A Ciambra is a 2017 Italian drama film directed by Jonas Carpignano. It was screened in the Directors' Fortnight section at the 2017 Cannes Film Festival. At Cannes in won the Europa Cinemas Label Award. It was selected as the Italian entry for the Best Foreign Language Film at the 90th Academy Awards, but it was not nominated. It is the second in the director's trilogy set in a Calabrian town, following Mediterranea (2015) and followed by A Chiara (2022).

Plot
Fourteen-year-old Pio Amato idolizes his older brother in their small Romani community in Calabria. Challenges mount after his older brother disappears.

Cast
 Pio Amato as Pio Amato
 Koudous Seihon
 Damiano Amato as Cosimo

Reception
On review aggregator website Rotten Tomatoes, the film has an approval rating of 90% based on 58 reviews, and an average rating of 7.1/10. On Metacritic, the film has a weighted average score of 70 out of 100, based on 17 critics, indicating "generally favorable reviews".

See also
 List of submissions to the 90th Academy Awards for Best Foreign Language Film
 List of Italian submissions for the Academy Award for Best Foreign Language Film

References

External links
 

2017 drama films
2017 films
Films scored by Dan Romer
Italian drama films
2010s Italian-language films
2010s Italian films